Howard Brothers Discount Stores (informally known as Howard Brothers and Howard's) was a chain of discount stores in the Southeastern United States. The chain was founded in 1959 by Alton Hardy Howard and W. L. "Jack" Howard, a five-term mayor of Monroe, Louisiana. The Howards were an early franchisee of Gibson's Discount Center, but they later pulled out of the franchise agreement and opened stores under their own name. In 1969, the company became a publicly traded company.

In 1978, the then 78-store chain was purchased by Gamble-Skogmo, which later merged with Wickes Companies.  It had stores in Alabama, Arkansas, Florida, Georgia, Kentucky,  Mississippi, Oklahoma, Tennessee, and Texas, as well as the Howards's native Louisiana.  The HBD management attempted a buyout in 1986, but was unsuccessful.

After the stores under their own name were liquidated, the Howard brothers started a new chain of wholesale warehouse stores under the name Super Saver. At least 21 stores were opened before the chain was sold to Wal-Mart.

References

External links
 1982 bankruptcy announcement
 1984 announcement of comeback strategy
 1986 announcement of management buyout attempt
 Alton Howard's obituary

Defunct discount stores of the United States
Retail companies established in 1959
Retail companies disestablished in 1986
Howard family (Louisiana)